The 2020–21 Egyptian Premier League, also known as The WE Egyptian Premier League for sponsorship purposes, was the 62nd season of the Egyptian Premier League, the top Egyptian professional league for association football clubs, since its establishment in 1948. The season started on 11 December 2020 and is concluded on 28 August 2021. Fixtures for the 2020–21 season was announced one week before the start of the competition.

The season was initially scheduled to start in July, but was delayed to November and later to December due to effects and consequence of the postponement of the previous season's conclusion due to the COVID-19 pandemic in Egypt.

Al Ahly were the defending champions, having won their 5th consecutive and 42nd overall league title in the previous season. Zamalek secured their 13th league title and their first since 2015 with two games to spare; ending Al Ahly's five-year dominance.

Teams

Eighteen teams will compete in the league - the top fifteen teams from the previous season, and three teams promoted from the Egyptian Second Division.

Teams promoted to the Egyptian Premier League
On 12 October 2020, National Bank of Egypt secured promotion for the first time in their history following a 1–1 draw with Asyut Petroleum in the final round, in which they finished the season at the top of Group A with equal points with second-placed Beni Suef, but they beat them on head-to-head points.

Ghazl El Mahalla became the second team to be promoted on 13 October, after spending four years in the Second Division, as they ended their season at the top of Group C, winning in the last round 2–1 against Olympic Club, thus having a two-point lead ahead of Pharco.

Ceramica Cleopatra were promoted for the first time in their history on 15 October, as they finished their season at the top of Group B, following a goalless draw with Gomhoriat Shebin in the last round, thus they were one point ahead of second-placed Petrojet.

Teams relegated to the Egyptian Second Division
The first club to be relegated was Tanta, who suffered an immediate return to the Egyptian Second Division following Wadi Degla's 4–1 away win against El Entag El Harby on 28 September 2020, which assured the relegation of the El Gharbia-based side. Despite having a decent start early in the previous season, Tanta's performance was progressively worsened and eventually led the club to go on a 17-game winless run and finish on bottom of the table.

The second club to be relegated was FC Masr, who also suffered an immediate return to the Egyptian Second Division following a 1–1 home draw with ENPPI on 3 October 2020 that confirmed the club's relegation. The club did not enjoy a good success in their first-ever season in top flight as they managed to win only 3 matches and conceded more goals that any other club in the league.

Haras El Hodoud became the last club to be relegated on 12 October, as they lost 1–2 to Zamalek in the 33rd round; thus returning to the Second Division after only two seasons in the top tier.

Venues

Notes

Personnel and kits

1. On the back of shirt.
2. On the sleeves.
 WE, Oppo, El Kasrawy Group, SAIB Bank, EgyptAir and GLC Paints are the league's main sponsors, and their logos are printed on most teams' kits.
 Referee kits are made by Puma.

Managerial changes

Foreign players
Clubs can have a maximum of four foreign players registered during the season. Clubs cannot sign foreign players unless these players have played in the first or second tier in their countries. Clubs also cannot sign any foreign goalkeepers. In addition, each club can register a player from Palestine, Syria, or the UNAF region; those players are not counted as foreign players. Also, any foreign player who holds Egyptian nationality is not considered a foreign player and will be registered as a local player. For example, Al Masry's player Mahmoud Wadi of Palestine holds both Palestinan and Egyptian nationalities, and as a result he is not registered as a foreign player.

Players name followed with  indicates the player is playing out on loan.
Players name followed with § indicates the player is playing for the club on loan.
Players name in bold indicates the player is registered during the mid-season transfer window.
Players name in ITALICS indicates the player has left the club during the mid-season transfer window.

Results

League table

Results table

Season statistics
Goalkeeping

Most Cleansheets

Scoring

Top scorers

Assists

Top Assists

Number of teams by governorate

References

2
 
Egyptian Premier League
Egypt